Pennington County is a county in the U.S. state of South Dakota. As of the 2020 census, the population was 109,222, making it the second-most populous county in South Dakota. Its county seat is Rapid City. The county was created in 1875, and was organized in 1877. It is named for John L. Pennington, fifth Governor of Dakota Territory, who held office in 1875 when the county was formed.

Pennington County is included in the Rapid City metropolitan statistical area. It is also the location of Mount Rushmore.

History
In 1874, US Army commander George A. Custer led a group into the Black Hills area. He and some of his officers climbed the crest now called Black Elk Peak, and made a toast to US General William S. Harney. They named the peak for Harney, and this name was used until 2016.  This expedition reported that gold could be found in the Black Hills, which spurred a gold rush into the future county area. The mining settlements that sprang up were in violation of a treaty signed with the Sioux Nation in 1868. By 1875, settlement was sufficient to justify creation of a local governing organization, so Pennington County was created on January 11, 1875, and it was fully organized by April 19, 1877. The county's boundaries were adjusted in 1877 and in 1898.

The county seat was initially at Sheridan, a mining camp. (Sheridan is credited with hosting the first Federal Court west of the Missouri River.) In 1878, the county seat was moved to Rapid City.

In 1923, Doane Robinson, superintendent of the SD State Historical Society, began promoting the concept of a giant sculpture carved from a Black Hills mountain. By 1927 this concept took substance, when work on Mount Rushmore began.

Shortly after the US entered World War II, an Army training airbase was established in Pennington County. It has continued until the present, now known as Ellsworth Air Force Base. Supporting this activity has provided a substantial portion of the county's economic base since that time.

Geography

Pennington County is located on the west line of South Dakota. Its west boundary line abuts the east boundary line of the state of Wyoming. Its west end contains the nation's highest peak east of the continental divide, Black Elk Peak. The rugged arid western end contains forest and gullies, descendending to rough rolling hill country in the east. The Cheyenne River flows north-northeastward through the center of the county and then along its northeastern border on its way to discharge in the Missouri River, while Rapid Creek flows east-southeastward through the western part, to discharge into the Cheyenne at the county's midpoint. The county terrain varies in elevation from Black Elk Peak at 7,242' (2207m) to its NE corner, at 1,896' (578m) ASL.

It is the third-largest county in South Dakota by area.

Major highways
  Interstate 90
  U.S. Highway 14
  U.S. Highway 16
  U.S. Highway 16A
  U.S. Highway 385
  South Dakota Highway 40
  South Dakota Highway 44
  South Dakota Highway 240
  South Dakota Highway 244

Adjacent counties
 Meade County – north
 Ziebach County - northeast
 Haakon County – northeast
 Jackson County – southeast
 Oglala Lakota County – south
 Custer County – southwest
 Weston County, Wyoming – west
 Lawrence County – northwest

National protected areas
 Badlands National Park (part)
 Badlands Wilderness
 Black Hills National Forest (part)
 Black Elk Wilderness (part)
 Buffalo Gap National Grassland (part)
 Minuteman Missile National Historic Site (part)
 Mount Rushmore National Memorial

Lakes and reservoirs
 Deerfield Lake
 Pactola Reservoir
 Shearer Lake
 Sheridan Lake

Demographics

2000 census
As of the 2000 United States Census, there were 88,565 people, 34,641 households, and 23,278 families in the county. The population density was 32 people per square mile (12/km2). There were 37,249 housing units at an average density of 13 per square mile (5/km2). The racial makeup of the county was 86.70% White, 0.85% Black or African American, 8.09% Native American, 0.88% Asian, 0.06% Pacific Islander, 0.68%% from other races, and 2.74% from two or more races. 2.64% of the population were Hispanic or Latino of any race.

There were 34,641 households, out of which 33.50% had children under the age of 18 living with them, 51.30% were married couples living together, 11.70% had a female householder with no husband present, and 32.80% were non-families. 26.10% of all households were made up of individuals, and 8.40% had someone living alone who was 65 years of age or older.  The average household size was 2.49 and the average family size was 3.00.

The county population contained 26.60% under the age of 18, 10.50% from 18 to 24, 29.20% from 25 to 44, 21.90% from 45 to 64, and 11.80% who were 65 years of age or older. The median age was 35 years. For every 100 females, there were 98.30 males. For every 100 females age 18 and over, there were 95.70 males.

The median income for a household in the county was $37,485, and the median income for a family was $44,796. Males had a median income of $30,608 versus $21,540 for females. The per capita income for the county was $18,938. About 8.60% of families and 11.50% of the population were below the poverty line, including 15.60% of those under age 18 and 6.50% of those age 65 or over.

2010 census
As of the 2010 United States Census, there were 100,948 people, 41,251 households, and 26,323 families in the county. The racial makeup of the county was 83.6% white, 9.7% American Indian, 1.0% black or African American, 1.0% Asian, 0.1% Pacific islander, 0.8% from other races, and 3.8% from two or more races. Those of Hispanic or Latino origin made up 4.0% of the population. In terms of ancestry, 38.0% were German, 14.3% were Irish, 11.0% were Norwegian, 10.2% were English, and 3.6% were American.

Of the 41,251 households, 31.5% had children under the age of 18 living with them, 47.1% were married couples living together, 11.7% had a female householder with no husband present, 36.2% were non-families, and 29.0% of all households were made up of individuals. The average household size was 2.38 and the average family size was 2.93. The median age was 36.8 years.

The median income for a household in the county was $46,849 and the median income for a family was $57,278. Males had a median income of $38,626 versus $30,251 for females. The per capita income for the county was $25,894. About 9.4% of families and 14.0% of the population were below the poverty line, including 20.7% of those under age 18 and 7.6% of those age 65 or over.

Law enforcement & emergency services
The Pennington County Sheriff's Office provides county-wide law enforcement services to the county. There are 118 deputies in the Patrol Division, in addition court services, investigations, and operation of the Pennington County Jail. The sheriff's office is headquartered in Rapid City. The sheriff's office issues concealed pistol permits to county residents. The current Sheriff is Kevin Thom.

The Sheriff's Office also operates the Pennington County Search and Rescue (PCSAR) team, a volunteer search and rescue (SAR) team based in Rapid City, was established in 1973, prompted by a 1972 flood in Rapid City. It serves residents and tourists in the county and the Black Hills area.

Communities

Cities
 Box Elder
 Hill City
 New Underwood
 Rapid City (county seat)

Towns
 Keystone
 Quinn
 Wall
 Wasta

Census-designated places
 Ashland Heights
 Caputa
 Colonial Pine Hills
 Green Valley
 Johnson Siding
 Rapid Valley

Unincorporated communities
 Ajax
 Colonial Pine Hills
 Creighton
 Ellsworth AFB
 Farmingdale
 Hisega
 Imlay
 Owanka
 Merritt (partial)
 Mystic
 Pedro
 Rochford
 Rockerville
 Scenic
 Silver City
 Three Forks
 Wicksville

Ghost towns
 Addie Camp
 Conata
 Creighton
 Etta
 Moon
 Myers City
 Pactola
 Pedro
 Redfern
 Sheridan
 Teddy Bear
 Tigerville

Townships
Ash
Castle Butte
Cedar Butte
Conata
Crooked Creek
Fairview
Flat Butte
Huron
Imlay
Lake Creek
Lake Flat
Lake Hill
Owanka
Peno
Quinn
Rainy Creek/Cheyenne
Scenic
Shyne
Sunnyside
Wasta

Unorganized territories
 Central Pennington
 Dalzell Canyon
 East Central Pennington
 Mount Rushmore
 Northeast Pennington
 Rapid City East
 West Pennington

Politics
Pennington County is very conservative for an urban county. It has been strongly Republican for decades, having voted Republican in all but one presidential election since 1936 (Johnson's landslide victory in 1964). Indeed, a Democrat has only garnered 40 percent of the county's vote three times since 1948.

See also
 National Register of Historic Places listings in Pennington County, South Dakota

References

External links
 Pennington County, SD government website
 Badlands Visitor Information  Badlands Visitor Information and Recommendations

 
Rapid City, South Dakota metropolitan area
Black Hills
1877 establishments in Dakota Territory
Populated places established in 1877